The 2022 Arizona Attorney General election took place on November 8, 2022, to elect the next attorney general of Arizona concurrently with other federal and state elections. Incumbent Republican Attorney General Mark Brnovich was term-limited and could not seek re-election to a third term in office. Democrat Kris Mayes defeated Republican Abe Hamadeh in one of the closest elections in Arizona history.

On November 21, the final tally of votes initially left Mayes leading Hamadeh by just 510 votes out of more than 2.5 million cast. This triggered an automatic recount under Arizona law; the recount was completed on December 29 with the Democrat winning by an even slimmer 280 vote margin and just 0.01%, making it the closest statewide election in any state in 2022. The results were certified by the Secretary of State and the election process completed on December 29. Hamadeh filed a lawsuit to block certification of the election, but state courts rejected it as election challenges could only be filed after certification. Mayes became the first of her party to win this office since Terry Goddard in 2006.

Republican primary

Candidates

Declared
Lacy Cooper, former assistant U.S. Attorney
Rodney Glassman, former Tucson city councilor, nominee for Corporation Commission in 2018, and Democratic nominee for U.S. Senate in 2010
Andrew Gould, former justice of the Arizona Supreme Court (2016–2021)
Dawn Grove, chair of the Arizona Chamber of Commerce and Industry
Abraham Hamadeh, former Maricopa County prosecutor and U.S. Army captain

Endorsements

Polling

Results

Democratic primary

Candidates

Declared 
Kris Mayes, former chair of the Arizona Corporation Commission (2003–2010) and press secretary for Janet Napolitano's 2002 gubernatorial campaign

Withdrew
Diego Rodriguez, former state representative for the 27th district
Robert McWhriter, civil rights attorney

Declined
January Contreras, former director of the Arizona Department of Health Services and nominee for attorney general in 2018

Endorsements

Results

Libertarian primary

Candidates

Declared
Michael Kielsky, attorney and perennial candidate (write-in)

Results

General election

Predictions

Endorsements

Polling
Graphical summary

Certified results

Recount
On December 5, 2022, following election certification, Secretary of State Katie Hobbs petitioned the Maricopa County Superior Court to initiate a recount for the Attorney General election. On the same day, Maricopa County Superior Court Judge Timothy J. Thomason ordered for the recount to begin. Under Arizona state law, an automatic recount is triggered if the margin is ≤0.5%. In the Attorney General race, Democrat Kris Mayes leads Republican Abraham Hamadeh by 510 votes, a margin of 0.02%, which falls within the automatic recount threshold.

As of December 28, all counties have completed their recount tabulations and audited and sent their final results to the Arizona Secretary of State's office. The office will compile and provide the results to the Maricopa County Superior Court, which may be released upon the court's certification. This hearing was scheduled for the 21st, however the office motioned the court on that day to reschedule it to the 29th at 10 a.m. (only 4 days prior to the inauguration of the winner) due to the delays in Pinal County. 

On December 29, Judge Timothy Thomason announced the results of the recount, confirming Kris Mayes as the winner with a reduced margin of 280 votes.

Recount results

By county

Lawsuit over result 

Hamadeh filed a lawsuit regarding the result of the election. On December 20, judge Lee Jantzen of Mohave County Superior Court denied Kris Mayes and Secretary of State Katie Hobbs' motion to dismiss and stated that Hamadeh "is not alleging political motives or fraud or personal agendas being pushed", but "is simply alleging misconduct by mistake, or omission by election officials, led to erroneous count of votes and which if true could have led to an uncertain result." Jantzen added that honest mistakes by officials could not be used to overturn an election. Kris Mayes' attorney repeatedly stated that the evidence brought forward by Hamadeh was not large enough to ever be accepted by the strict standards of election law.  Jantzen dismissed one count of the lawsuit alleging that unverified early ballots were illegal votes. 

This allowed for Hamadeh's lawsuit to proceed to an evidentiary hearing, which was held on December 23, lasting for three hours, with the result being that Judge Jantzen, ruling from the bench, denied Hamadeh's election challenge. Jantzen told Hamadeh's lawyer "you just haven't proven your case", with an absence of "even slight information" that "the election was done illegally or incorrectly." Jantzen declined to accept Hamadeh's lawyer's request to shift the vote margin as not being in the court's purview.  Hamadeh's lawyer acknowledged to the court that his findings were insufficient. Mayes' attorney stated he would request the court to sanction him over the frivolous nature of the lawsuit, stating that in 37 years of practice he had "never been involved in such a gigantic waste of time as this case," adding "The judiciary and the bar needs to step up to the plate here and to sanction this conduct" and "it has gone too far for too long." An attorney for the secretary of state's office commented the proceedings had been a "spectacular waste of everyone's time.”

Notes

Partisan clients

See also
2022 Arizona elections

References

External links
Official campaign websites
Abraham Hamadeh (R) for Attorney General
Kristin Mayes (D) for Attorney General

Attorney General
Arizona
Arizona Attorney General elections